KYEL (105.5 FM, "99.3/105.5 The Eagle") is a radio station licensed to serve Danville, Arkansas, United States. The station is owned by Bobby Caldwell's EAB of Russellville, LLC. It airs a classic rock music format.

The station was assigned the KYEL call letters by the Federal Communications Commission on April 10, 2002.

On March 1, 2017, KYEL changed their format from country to a simulcast of classic rock-formatted KCON 99.3 FM Atkins (now KASR). (info taken from stationintel.com)

References

External links

YEL
Classic rock radio stations in the United States
Yell County, Arkansas
Radio stations established in 2003
2003 establishments in Arkansas